Merrill Ellis may refer to:

Merrill Leroy Ellis, American composer
Merrill D. Ellis, representative to the Great and General Court